11th Visual Effects Society Awards
February 5, 2013

Best Visual Effects in a Visual Effects Driven Motion Picture:
Life of Pi

The 11th Visual Effects Society Awards was held in Los Angeles at the Beverly Hilton Hotel on February 5, 2013, in honor to the best visual effects in film and television of 2012.

Winners and nominees
(winners in bold)

Honorary Awards
Lifetime Achievement Award:
Richard Edlund
VES Visionary Award:
Ang Lee

Film

Television

Other categories

References

External links
 Visual Effects Society

2012
Visual Effects Society Awards
Visual Effects Society Awards
Visual Effects Society Awards
Visual Effects Society Awards